Rule 34 is an Internet meme which claims that Internet pornography exists concerning every possible topic. The concept is commonly depicted as fan art of normally non-erotic subjects engaging in sexual behavior and/or activity. It can also include writings, animations, images, GIFs and any other form of media to which the internet provides opportunities for proliferation and redistribution.

History 
The phrase "Rule 34" was coined from an August 13, 2003 webcomic captioned, "Rule #34 There is porn of it. No exceptions." The comic was drawn by TangoStari (Peter Morley-Souter) to depict his shock at seeing Calvin and Hobbes parody porn. Although the comic faded into obscurity, the caption instantly became popular on the Internet. Since then, the phrase has been adapted into different syntactic versions and has even been used as a verb.

On August 20, 2007, the webcomic xkcd published a comic titled "Rule 34", which involved hypothetical sexual scenarios including homoerotic spelling bees.

In 2008, users on the imageboard 4chan posted numerous sexually explicit parodies and cartoons illustrating Rule 34. On there, pornography is referred to as "rule 34" or "pr0nz". The Dictionary of Modern Proverbs claims that Rule 34 "began appearing on Internet postings in 2008."

As Rule 34 continued spreading throughout the Internet, some traditional media began reporting on it. A 2009 Daily Telegraph article listed Rule 34 as the third of the "Top 10" Internet rules and laws. A 2013 CNN story said Rule 34 was "likely the most famous" Internet rule that has become part of mainstream culture. On November 14, 2018, a Twitch streamer nicknamed "Drypiss" celebrated his 18th birthday by posting a video to Twitter in which he looked up Rule 34 pictures; afterwards, the video and its responses were covered by The Daily Dot.

Fan fiction has eroticized numerous political figures from the 2016 United States presidential election and the 2021 Suez Canal obstruction by the container ship Ever Given. Short low-cost books called "Tinglers" have depicted anthropomorphized dinosaurs and airplanes in sexual acts. A pseudonymous author, Chuck Tingle, published dystopian erotica on Brexit, featuring sex with a giant one-pound coin from the future, a few hours after the referendum passed.

Analysis 
According to researchers Ogi Ogas and Sai Gaddam, the reason that the maxim resonated with so many people is because of its apparent truth to anyone who has browsed the Internet. Ogas said that following the 2009–2010 study, the consolidation of the porn industry onto large market share video aggregators has reduced the visibility of the niche market videos. The sites favor mainstream content directly by steering users towards it and indirectly by disadvantaging small producers who cannot afford strong anti-piracy measures, bringing into doubt the ability of the rule being able to keep up with market.

Cory Doctorow concludes, "Rule 34 can be thought of as a kind of indictment of the Web as a cesspit of freaks, geeks, and weirdos, but seen through the lens of cosmopolitanism, bespeaks a certain sophistication—a gourmet approach to life."

A Finnish feminist scholar Susanna Paasonen summarizes Rule 34, along with versions of Rules 35 and 36 to mean that no matter how unlikely or unusual the concept, pornography of it is either available online or will be available sooner or later. John Paul Stadler concluded that Rule 34 reflects the codification of paraphilias into social identity structures.

Variations 
The original rule was rephrased and reiterated as it went viral on the Web. Some common permutations omit the original "No exceptions."
 "Rule 34: There is porn of it."
 "Rule 34: If it exists, there is porn of it."
 "Rule 34: If it exists, or can be imagined, there is Internet porn of it."
 "Rule 34: If you can imagine it, it exists as Internet porn."
 “Rule 34(r): If it exists, there is a subreddit devoted to it.”

Corollaries 
 "Rule 35: The exception to Rule 34 is the citation of Rule 34."
 "Rule 35: If there is no porn, it will be made."
 "Rule 36: There will always be more fucked up shit than what you just saw."
 "Rule 46 (sometimes labeled as Rule 88): There is always furry porn of it."
 "Rule 63: For every given male character, there is a female version of that character and vice versa."

See also 

 
 Clop – A slang term for either fan made or non-fan made pornography based on the animated children's television series My Little Pony: Friendship Is Magic
 
 List of Internet phenomena
 
 Overwatch and pornography – A notable case of pornography inspired by the video game Overwatch
 
 Rule 34 – A novel by Charles Stross referencing this rule.
 Rule 34 – A film by Julia Murat referencing this rule.

References

External links 

 Rules of the Internet 1000 Rules Of the Internet

Anime and manga terminology
Cartooning
Internet culture
Internet slang
Internet terminology
Pornography
2003 neologisms
Internet memes
Internet memes introduced in 2007
Adages